Connor Joseph Jennings (born 29 October 1991) is an English professional footballer who plays as a forward for League Two side Hartlepool United.

Jennings started his career with Stalybridge Celtic in the 2008–09 season, staying with them until halfway through 2011–12, where he scored over 50 goals in over 100 games, before moving on to Scunthorpe United. He played once for the England national C team, scoring one goal.

Club career

Stalybridge Celtic
Jennings was born in Manchester, Greater Manchester. He rose through the youth team at Stalybridge Celtic and made his debut for the club, on 3 March 2009, coming on as a substitute and scoring in a 7–1 victory over Hinckley United. He scored his second and third goals for the club as part of a 4–0 win over Burscough in April 2009. He started off the 2009–10 season well scoring once in August, as Celtic won 3–1 at home to Vauxhall Motors. He finished that season with 11 goals in all competitions. He got his 2010–11 season of to a good start by scoring in a 2–1 defeat to Nuneaton Town. This turned out to be his most prolific season yet, scoring 18 goals, including two brace's towards the end of the season, against Gloucester City and Vauxhall Motors.

After a prolific season in 2010–11, he got his 2011–12 season of to a great start, scoring five goals in August. He went on to score ten goals in the next three months, including brace's against Altrincham and Worcester City. In December 2011, he scored another brace, hitting both of Celtic's goals in a 2–2 draw with Stockport County in the FA Trophy. He followed that up by scoring a stoppage time winner in the replay at Bower Fold as his team won 2–1. On 1 January 2012, he scored his last goal on his last appearance for Stalybridge in stoppage time, scoring a penalty, which he won himself, his team lost the mach 3–1 to rivals Hyde. He scored 51 goals in 123 matches in all competitions, in his time at Stalybridge.

Scunthorpe United
Jennings signed for League One team Scunthorpe United on 5 January 2012 on a two-and-a-half-year contract for an undisclosed fee. He made his debut on 14 January, coming on as a 70th-minute substitute in a 1–1 draw at Colchester United. He scored his first goal for the club in a 5–5 draw with Derby County in the League Cup on 14 August 2012.

After 14 appearances for Scunthorpe in 2012–13, scoring one goal, he was loaned out to Conference Premier team Stockport County on 16 November 2012. He made his debut the day after, as his team lost 2–0 away to Nuneaton Town.

Jennings joined Macclesfield Town on loan at the start of 2013–14, initially until January. He returned to Scunthorpe on 15 December 2013 because of a calf injury.

On 28 February 2014, Jennings joined Conference Premier club Grimsby Town on an initial one-month loan. On 25 March 2014, Jennings extended his loan with Grimsby until the end of 2013–14.

Wrexham
On 11 July 2014, Jennings signed for Wrexham.

Tranmere Rovers
On 2 June 2016, Jennings joined Wrexham's National League rivals Tranmere Rovers on a two-year contract. Jennings' Tranmere career got off to a slow start, making just 11 appearances by January. Jennings was then loaned out to fellow National League club Macclesfield Town for whom he played 5 games, scoring 1 goal. Jennings returned to Tranmere in March and went on to establish himself as a first team regular until the end of the season, Jennings' stint in the side coincided with an excellent run of form for Tranmere which saw them narrowly miss out on the National League title. Jennings managed 6 goals in April 2017, 3 of which came in a 9–0 victory over Solihull Moors.

Jennings scored against Forest Green in the 2017 National League play-off final. His rising finish from distance was not enough to stop Tranmere's first Wembley appearance in 17 years ending in a 3–1 defeat.

In the 2018 National League play-off final, Jennings crossed for James Norwood to score the winning goal in Tranmere's 2–1 win over Boreham Wood.

He signed a new two-year contract with the club in May 2018.

In the 2019 League Two play-off final, Jennings scored the only goal of the game as Tranmere beat Newport County 1–0.

Stockport County
After leaving Tranmere, Jennings signed for Stockport County on 16 July 2020.

On 7 November 2022, Jennings joined Altrincham on a one-month loan deal. This deal was then extended by a further month.

Hartlepool United
On 31 January 2023, Jennings signed for League Two side Hartlepool United on a permanent deal.

International career
He was selected to play for the England national C team against Gibraltar in November 2011, and he scored his first and England's only goal in that game, coming on as a 46th-minute substitute for Barrow's Adam Boyes.

Style of play
Jennings who plays as a striker, has been described as 'pacey'. He was also described as a 'stylish' player with an 'eye for goal'. On his arrival at Scunthorpe United, manager Alan Knill said about Jennings, "Technically, he is very good and very quick" he also added "Jennings can play in a number of positions and not just at Centre Forward".

Personal life
Connor's older brother, James, was also a footballer who played as a defender.

Career statistics

Honours
Wrexham
FA Trophy runner-up: 2014–15

Tranmere Rovers
League Two play-offs: 2019
National League play-offs: 2018

Stockport County
National League: 2021–22

Individual
Wrexham Player of the Year: 2015–16

References

External links
Profile at the Tranmere Rovers F.C. website

1991 births
Living people
Footballers from Manchester
English footballers
England semi-pro international footballers
Association football forwards
Stalybridge Celtic F.C. players
Scunthorpe United F.C. players
Stockport County F.C. players
Macclesfield Town F.C. players
Grimsby Town F.C. players
Wrexham A.F.C. players
Tranmere Rovers F.C. players
Altrincham F.C. players
Hartlepool United F.C. players
National League (English football) players
English Football League players